Bagaces is a canton in the Guanacaste province of Costa Rica. The head city is in Bagaces district.

History 
Bagaces was created on 7 December 1848 by decree 167. Bagaces is one of the oldest settlements in early Spanish conquest in the 1540s, where natives lived by a creek. It became an important town after 1601 when the "Mule Trail" was established communicating Cartago, the capital of the province, with Guatemala, the capital of the Captaincy General. Bagaces was a necessary night stop and later acquired fame because of its dry bisquist (Biscocho) and cheese (Queso Bagaces), an important supply for the long ride.

Geography 
Bagaces has an area of  km² and a mean elevation of  metres.

The Salto River on the west and Tenorio River on the east delineate this canton, with the Tempisque River as the southern border and the northern border high in the Cordillera de Guanacaste. Miravalles Volcano sits near that border's midway point.

Districts 
The canton of Bagaces is subdivided into the following districts:
 Bagaces
 Fortuna
 Mogote
 Río Naranjo

Demographics 

For the 2011 census, Bagaces had a population of  inhabitants.

Transportation

Road transportation 
The canton is covered by the following road routes:

References 

Cantons of Guanacaste Province
Populated places in Guanacaste Province